Valverda, is a small unincorporated community located in Pointe Coupee Parish, Louisiana, United States, very near the boundary with Iberville Parish. The community is served by Valverda Elementary School. Most high school-aged children attend Livonia High School, approximately three miles north.

Etymology
The community is named after the nearby Valverda Plantation.

References

Unincorporated communities in Pointe Coupee Parish, Louisiana
Baton Rouge metropolitan area
Unincorporated communities in Louisiana